Cicada 3301 is a nickname given to three sets of puzzles posted under the name "3301" online between 2012 and 2014. The first puzzle started on January 4, 2012, on 4chan and ran for nearly a month. A second round began one year later on January 4, 2013, and then a third round following the confirmation of a fresh clue posted on Twitter on January 4, 2014. The third puzzle has yet to be solved. The stated intent was to recruit "intelligent individuals" by presenting a series of puzzles to be solved; no new puzzles were published on January 4, 2015. A new clue was posted on Twitter on January 5, 2016. Cicada 3301 posted their last verified OpenPGP-signed message in April 2017, denying the validity of any unsigned puzzle.

The puzzles focused heavily on data security, cryptography, steganography, and internet anonymity. It has been called "the most elaborate and mysterious puzzle of the internet age", and is listed as one of the "top 5 eeriest, unsolved mysteries of the internet" by The Washington Post, and much speculation exists as to its function. Many have speculated that the puzzles are a recruitment tool for the NSA, CIA, MI6, a "Masonic conspiracy", or a cyber mercenary group. Others have stated Cicada 3301 is an alternate reality game, although no company or individual has attempted to monetize it. Some of the final contestants believe that Cicada 3301 is a remnant of the late 1980s and 1990s Cypherpunk movement. Dark Web: Cicada 3301, a film inspired by the organization, was released in 2021.

Purpose
The stated purpose of the puzzles each year was to recruit "highly intelligent individuals", although the ultimate purpose remains unknown. Some claimed that Cicada 3301 is a secret society with the goal of improving cryptography, privacy and anonymity. Others claimed that Cicada 3301 is a cult or religion. According to statements of several people who won the 2012 puzzle, 3301 typically uses non-puzzle-based recruiting methods, but created the Cicada puzzles because they were looking for potential members with cryptography and computer security skills.

Resolution
The first puzzle, of 2012, was solved by Marcus Wanner. According to him, those who solved the puzzles were asked questions about their support of information freedom, online privacy and freedom, and rejection of censorship. Those who answered satisfactorily at this stage were invited to a private forum, where they were instructed to devise and complete a project intended to further the ideals of the group. He did not finish his work on a method of general decryption and the website was removed.

Types of clues

The Cicada 3301 clues spanned many different forms of communication media, including the internet, telephone, original music, bootable Linux CDs, digital images, physical paper signs, and pages of unpublished cryptic books written in runes. One book, titled Liber Primus, literally "first book", contains many pages, only some of which have been decrypted. In addition to using many varying techniques to encrypt, encode, or hide data, these clues also referenced a wide variety of books, poetry, artwork and music. Each clue was signed by the same OpenPGP private key to confirm authenticity.

Allegations against the group

Allegations of illegal activity
Authorities from the Los Andes Province of Chile claimed that Cicada 3301 is a "hacker group" and engaged in illegal activities. Cicada 3301 responded to this claim by issuing a PGP-signed statement denying any involvement in illegal activity.

In July 2015, a group calling themselves "3301" hacked into Planned Parenthood's database; however, the group appeared to have no association to Cicada 3301. Cicada 3301 later issued a PGP-signed statement stating they "are not associated with this group in any way" and also stated that Cicada 3301 did not "condone their use of our name, number, or symbolism". The hacker group later confirmed that they were not affiliated with Cicada 3301.

Claims of being a cult
As the group gained notoriety and public attention, many asserted that the puzzles were an introduction to occult principles, and possibly even recruitment for a cult. Conspiracy theorist Tim Dailey, a former senior research fellow with the conservative Christian Family Research Council, analyzed Cicada 3301 puzzles and stated, "The enigmatic Cicada 3301 appears to be drawing participants inexorably into the dark web of the occult à la Blavatsky and Crowley. At the heart of the enchantment is the counterfeit promise of ultimate meaning through self-divination."

Others claimed that the Cicada 3301 puzzles are a modern and technological equivalent to the enlightenment journey within Western esotericism and mystery schools.

QAnon

During the first months of QAnon's existence, there were rumors that Cicada 3301 was behind "Q", the anonymous figure who originated the conspiracy theory, and that it had created the whole QAnon phenomenon as a form of live action role-playing game. An early QAnon promoter, media producer Lisa Clapier, urged Cicada 3301 puzzlers to take part in decoding Q's posts and "follow the white rabbit" to QAnon's posts. Despite this, 3301 themselves have not publicly stated to be involved with QAnon in any way.

In popular culture
The United States Navy released a cryptographic challenge based on the Cicada 3301 recruitment puzzles in 2014 calling it Project Architeuthis.

The plot of "Nautilus", the September 30, 2014 episode of the TV show Person of Interest, featured a large-scale game very similar to the Cicada 3301 puzzles. Both feature a series of worldwide cryptographic puzzles, but as the title implies, these feature the image of a nautilus shell instead of a cicada logo. Person of Interest creator Jonathan Nolan and producer Greg Plageman stated in an interview that Cicada 3301 was the inspiration for the episode: "Episode 2, I'm particularly fascinated by the subject underneath it. Look up Cicada 3301 on the internet. It's a very interesting concept out there that we then put into a larger story that connects to our show."

The organization is the subject of the 2021 comedy-thriller film Dark Web: Cicada 3301. Directed by Alan Ritchson, who co-wrote the script with Joshua Montcalm, it stars Jack Kesy, Conor Leslie, Ron Funches, Kris Holden-Ried, Andreas Apergis, and Ritchson. The film follows a hacker who participates in Cicada's recruitment game while evading the NSA.

In the video game Assassin's Creed Origins, a member of the Isu civilisation references Cicada when listing off various mysteries of history.

Music

There were two pieces of music, titled 'the Instar Emergence' and 'Interconnectedness,' accompanying the Cicada clues. However, none of them were part of a standard repertoire, and neither the composers nor performers have been identified.

Artists Rick Steff and Roy Berry of the band Lucero included a Cicada 3301-inspired song on their side-project album Superfluidity. The music video, directed by Charlie Fasano, featured artwork taken from the Liber Primus book by Cicada 3301.

Japanese artist Camellia included a Cicada 3301-inspired song on his album U.U.F.O.

See also
 11B-X-1371
 Mass collaboration
 Secret society
 Cypherpunk
 Brood XXII

References

External links
 
Alternate reality games
Foreign policy and strategy think tanks
Internet memes
Internet memes introduced in 2012
Internet mysteries
Multidisciplinary research institutes
Organizations established in 2012
Puzzle hunts
Science and technology think tanks
Secret societies
Works of unknown authorship